Dicranogonus is a genus of millipedes belonging to the family Paradoxosomatidae.

The species of this genus are found in Southern Australia.

Species:
 Dicranogonus pix Jeekel, 1982

References

Paradoxosomatidae